

Halstock is a village and civil parish in the county of Dorset in southern England, situated approximately  south of Yeovil in Somerset. It lies on the route of the ancient Harrow Way. In the 2011 census the parish had a population of 546.

Halstock formerly constituted a liberty, containing only the parish itself. It was the site of the martyrdom of Saint Juthwara (Juthware), and a Romano-British Villa excavated between 1967 and 1985.

The village formerly had two inns, "The New Inn" (New Inn Farm), which closed in the late 1950s, and the unusually named "The Quiet Woman" (usually taken as a reference to St Juthware)

In July 2012, Halstock's Parish church of St Mary was rededicated by the Bishop of Sherborne to become "St Juthware and St Mary", in recognition of the local tradition. Much of the church was rebuilt in 1770, with only the 15th-century west tower not being affected. The nave and chancel were rebuilt again on separate dates in the 19th century.

Halstock lies within an electoral ward of the same name, which also contains several nearby parishes including Corscombe, Evershot and Hilfield. The population of this ward at the 2011 census was 1,848. This ward is one of 32 that comprise the West Dorset parliamentary constituency, which is currently represented in the UK national parliament by the Conservative Chris Loder, who succeeded Oliver Letwin in 2019.

See also
 List of liberties in Dorset

Notes

References

External links

 Corscombe & Halstock village website

Villages in Dorset
Liberties of Dorset